Craugastor rostralis is a species of frog in the family Craugastoridae.
It is found in Guatemala and Honduras.
Its natural habitats are subtropical or tropical moist montane forests, plantations, and heavily degraded former forest.
It is threatened by habitat loss.

References

 Cruz, G., Wilson, L.D., McCranie, R. & Acevedo, M. 2004.  Craugastor rostralis.   2006 IUCN Red List of Threatened Species.   Downloaded on 22 July 2007.

rostralis
Amphibians described in 1896
Taxonomy articles created by Polbot